This is a list of Norwegian television related events from 2010.

Events
21 May - 23-year-old rapper Kristian Rønning wins the third series of Norske Talenter.
29 May - The 55th Eurovision Song Contest is held at the Telenor Arena in Oslo. Germany wins the contest with the song "Satellite", performed by Lena.
27 November - Comedian Åsleik Engmark and his partner Nadya Khamitskaya win the sixth series of Skal vi danse?.
17 December - Hans Bollandsås wins the second and final series of X Factor.

Debuts

Television shows

2000s
Skal vi danse? (2006–present)
Norske Talenter (2008–present)

Ending this year
X Factor (2009–2010)

Births

Deaths

See also
2010 in Norway